Michèle Cotta (born 15 June 1937) is a French political journalist.

Biography
Her father was the mayor of Nice. She started her career as a journalist for Combat. She moved on to interviewing politicians for L'Express, under the tutelage of Jean-Jacques Servan-Schreiber and Françoise Giroud. Between 1981 and 1986, then-President François Mitterrand appointed her as Head of Radio France, followed by the Haute Autorité, now known as the Conseil supérieur de l'audiovisuel. She also served as news director for TF1 and program director for France 2. She now teaches at Sciences Po. She is also an editor for the Nouvel économiste and Direct Soir.

In 1983, she became the first woman to join the think tank Le Siècle.

Bibliography
La Collaboration, 1940-1944 (Paris: Armand Colin, 1964)
Les élections présidentielles de 1965 (co-written with Jean-François Revel, Imprimerie Busson, 1966)
Les miroirs de Jupiter (Paris: Fayard, 1986)
La Sixième République (Paris: Flammarion, 1992)
Les secrets d'une victoire (Paris: Flammarion, 1999)
Carnets secrets de la Présidentielle : mars 2001 - mai 2002 (Paris: Plon, 2002)
Politic Circus (Paris: L’Archipel, 2004)
Cahiers secrets de la Ve République, tome 1, 1965-1977 (Paris: Fayard, 2007)
Cahiers secrets de la Ve République, tome 2, 1977-1986 (Paris: Fayard, 2008)
Cahiers secrets de la Ve République, tome 3, 1986-1997 (Paris: Fayard, 2009)

References

1937 births
Living people
French women journalists
French television journalists
French television executives
Women television executives
People from Nice
French people of Italian descent
French political commentators
French political writers
Academic staff of Sciences Po
Commandeurs of the Légion d'honneur